Pinecrest, is an unincorporated community in southeastern Hillsborough County, Florida,  United States, located at the intersection of Lithia-Pinecrest Road (Hillsborough County Road 640), and state highway 39.

Education
In 1936, Keysville, Welcome, and Picnic joined together to form a school with grades one through nine, and one year later expanded to grades 1-12. The first graduating class was in 1938. Like many schools in the area, it began as a strawberry school, where the students attended during the summer months and took the winter months off to bring in the strawberry crop. The school burned in 1963, but was rebuilt and is currently in use as Pinecrest Elementary school.  The high school closed in 1972, with the students being rezoned to either Brandon High School or East Bay High School Current students are zoned to Pinecrest Elementary, Randall Middle School and Newsome High School.

References

Unincorporated communities in Hillsborough County, Florida
Unincorporated communities in Florida